Gulu–Nimule Road is a road in the Northern Region of Uganda, connecting the city of Gulu in Gulu District and the town of Nimule in Eastern Equatoria State in South Sudan, just north of the international border between the two countries. The road, known as Highway A104 in Uganda, continues into South Sudan as Highway A43.

Location
The coordinates of the road near Atiak in Amuru District are 3°17'02.0"N, 32°07'04.0"E (Longitude:3.283889; Latitude:32.117778).

Overview
Before 2009, the Gulu–Nimule Road was a gravel-surfaced, two-lane road. It is a major route of transportation between Uganda and South Sudan. During the rainy season, the road became impassable, as was the case in 2008 when rains closed it for a week. In March 2009, the World Bank agreed to fund the engineering design of the improved road to an all-weather tarmac surface. Vice Consulting Engineers, a South African firm, was awarded the contract to design the road at a cost of US$800,000. The government of Japan, through the Japan International Cooperation Agency (JICA), and the World Bank will provide the loans to fund the construction, expected to cost US$102 million.

Construct timeline
The costs for this section of the road was met by the Government of Uganda and the World Bank. Construction began in May 2012 and was expected to last two years. That contract was awarded to China Railway Wuju Group Corporation, a division of China Railway Engineering Corporation. Construction of that section was commissioned in August 2013. Completion is expected in May 2016. On 21 July 2015, Yoweri Museveni, the president of Uganda, officially commissioned the completed road.

Points of interest
The following landmarks lie close or near the Gulu–Nimule Road:

(5) the town of Elegu, in Amuru District. This is the last town in Uganda, before the road reaches the International border between Uganda and South Sudan at Nimule.

See also
 Transport in Uganda
 List of roads in Uganda
 List of cities and towns in Uganda

References

External links
 Uganda National Road Authority Homepage
 Road Construction Costs Raised to US$160 Million
 Gulu-Nimule Road Summary

Roads in Uganda
Roads in South Sudan
Road infrastructure in Uganda
Gulu District
Amuru District
Transport infrastructure in Uganda
Transport infrastructure in Africa